UAR was the United Arab Republic, a state formed by the union of the republics of Egypt and Syria in 1958.

UAR or Uar may also refer to:

 Uar (tribe), a tribe in Central Asia and China
 Understanding Animal Research, a British advocacy group
 Unión Argentina de Rugby, the official governing body of rugby union in Argentina
 Union of African Railways, an organization of African railways
 United Artists Records, American record label
 Genetic code for stop codon
 ICAO designator for Aerostar Airlines, a Ukrainian airline